The Aeronautical Division, Signal Corps (1907–1914) was the first heavier-than-air military aviation organization in history and the progenitor of the United States Air Force. A component of the U.S. Army Signal Corps, the Aeronautical Division procured the first powered military aircraft in 1909, created schools to train its aviators, and initiated a rating system for pilot qualifications. It organized and deployed the first permanent American aviation unit, the 1st Aero Squadron, in 1913. The Aeronautical Division trained 51 officers and 2 enlisted men as pilots, and incurred 13 fatalities in air crashes. During this period, the Aeronautical Division had 29 factory-built aircraft in its inventory, built a 30th from spare parts, and leased a civilian airplane for a short period in 1911.

Following statutory authorization of an Aviation Section in the Signal Corps by the United States Congress in 1914, the Aeronautical Division continued as the primary organizational component of the section until April 1918, when its inefficiency in mobilizing for World War I caused the War Department to replace it with an organization independent of the Signal Corps that eventually became the foundation of the Army's Air Service.

Birth of an air arm

The United States Army Signal Corps became associated with aeronautics during the American Civil War, when Thaddeus S. C. Lowe was named chief of the Union Army Balloon Corps. In 1892, Major General Adolphus Greely, Chief Signal officer of the Army, formulated plans for a War Balloon detachment for the Signal Corps and authorized the purchase of a balloon from France, dubbed the General Myer, based at Fort Riley in 1893 and Fort Logan in 1894. When the General Myer deteriorated, a second balloon, the Santiago, was manufactured by members of the Signal Corps in 1897 using the General Myer as a model, and served in combat in Cuba in 1898.

In 1898–99, the War Department accepted the report of an aeronautically-minded investigating committee that included Alexander Graham Bell and invested $50,000 for the rights to a heavier-than-air flying machine being developed by Samuel Pierpont Langley, Secretary of the Smithsonian Institution. Although Langley's "Aerodrome" failed embarrassingly, the Army later resumed its interest in aviation as a result of the success of the Wright Brothers and entered into protracted negotiations for an airplane.

All balloon school activities of the U.S. Army Signal Corps were transferred to Fort Omaha, Nebraska, in 1905. In 1906, the commandant of the Signal School in Fort Leavenworth, Kansas, Major George O. Squier, studied aeronautical theory and lectured on the Wright flying machine. One of his instructors—Captain Billy Mitchell—was also a student of aviation and taught the use of reconnaissance balloons. Squier became executive officer to the Chief Signal Officer, Brigadier General James Allen, in July 1907, and immediately convinced Allen to create an aviation entity within the Signal Corps.

The Aeronautical Division, Signal Corps, consisting at its inception of one officer and two enlisted men, began operation on August 1, 1907. Captain Charles deForest Chandler was named to head the new division, with Corporal Edward Ward and Private First Class Joseph E. Barrett as his assistants.  1st Lt. Frank P. Lahm, a cavalry officer, was also detailed to the division and joined it September 17, 1907. Both Chandler and Lahm were balloonists. Lahm had earned renown the year before when he won the inaugural Gordon Bennett Cup, an international balloon event, while Chandler was already a member of the Aero Club of America. He remained head of the division until 1908, then again from 1911 to 1913. During the interim, he was relieved by Lahm and from May 1910 to June 1911 (while Chandler attended the Signal School Course at Fort Leavenworth) by Capt. Arthur S. Cowan, a former infantry officer and non-aviator assigned to the Signal School.

On December 23, 1907, the Signal Corps issued Specification No. 486 for a heavier-than-air flying machine and requested bids. A copy of the specification was sent to the Wrights on January 3, 1908.  The following April 30 Lahm and 1st Lt. Thomas E. Selfridge reported to New York City along with civilian balloonist Leo Stevens to familiarize 25 members of the First Company, Signal Corps, a unit of the 71st New York Infantry, in the use of hydrogen-filled kite balloons. The company was organized to provide the New York National Guard with an "aeronautical corps" for balloon observation, commanded by Major Oscar Erlandean.

Acquisition of aircraft
Specification No. 486 required both types of aircraft be able to carry two persons.

The dirigible was delivered first, in July 1908, after Baldwin submitted an extremely low bid to ensure receiving the contract.  Baldwin and Glenn Curtiss flew the test trials over Fort Myer and met all specifications except speed, which was just under the requirement. It was designated Signal Corps Dirigible No. 1. During August, Baldwin trained three officer candidates to fly the dirigible: Lahm, Selfridge, and 1st Lt. Benjamin Foulois, Infantry. Foulois was trained as the first dirigible pilot and prepared to move the ship from Fort Omaha to St. Joseph, Missouri, for a state fair exhibition. However, the first solo ascent in the dirigible, and the first flight solely by army pilots, did not occur until May 26, 1909.

The Wright Brothers, who had been asking  for their airplane, then agreed to sell a Wright Model A satisfying the requirements for $25,000 (they also received a  bonus for exceeding the speed requirement). The airplane was delivered to Fort Myer, Virginia, on September 1, 1908, for trials. The first acceptance flight of the airplane was made on September 3 at Fort Myer, with Orville at the controls. Selfridge and Lahm were named official observers of the trials of the Wright aeroplane for September 1908. Both Lahm and Squier made acceptance flights as observers, and on September 13, Wright kept the airplane aloft for an hour and ten minutes.

On the afternoon of September 17, 1908, two officers of the United States Navy, Lieut. George C. Sweet and Naval Constructor (Lieut.) William McEntee, and another from the Marine Corps, 2nd Lt. Richard B. Creecy, were present at Fort Myer as official observers, accompanied by Secretary of the Navy Victor H. Metcalf. Under orders to travel to St. Joseph for the dirigible exhibition, Selfridge asked to take Sweet's place on a scheduled test flight, conducted in front of 2,500 onlookers. Wright was hospitalized, and Selfridge—the Army's only officer experienced in heavier-than-air flight—was killed in the first fatal crash of an airplane.

Orville Wright, along with Wilbur this time, returned to Fort Myer in June 1909 with a new though smaller and faster airplane, powered by the engine from the wrecked 1908 Flyer. The brothers spent the better part of July fine tuning the airplane and warming up for the final tests while bad flying weather hampered much of the month. For 1909's acceptance trials both Lahm and Foulois were named as official observers.

Lahm flew with Wright on July 27, and on July 30, with President William H. Taft as a spectator, Foulois and Wright in the final acceptance trial made a cross country flight of  around Shuter's (or Shooters) Hill between Fort Myer and Alexandria, Virginia. This flight broke all of the existing records for speed, duration with a passenger, and altitude with a passenger.

Airplane operations

First solo flights
The Army accepted the Wright A Military Flyer on August 2, 1909, designating it "Signal Corps (S.C.) No. 1". On August 25, the Army leased  of land along the Baltimore and Ohio Railroad at College Park, Maryland, for use as a training field. The newly purchased airplane was delivered to College Park on October 7, assembled by Wilbur Wright, and flown for the first time the next day. Wright began instruction of Lahm and 2nd Lt Frederic E. Humphreys, detailed from the Corps of Engineers, flying constantly in front of often large crowds of curiosity seekers, newspaper reporters, and dignitaries. Both soloed on October 26, Humphreys going ahead of Lahm (the detachment commander) because it was his turn to fly. The Army's contract with the Wright Brothers ended with the completion of training of the two student pilots, and Wilbur Wright made his last public flight on November 2. Later that day, Lahm took Lieut. Sweet up as a passenger and he became the first naval officer to fly.

On November 5, both pilots were aboard the airplane, with Lahm at the controls, when it crashed in a low altitude turn. Although neither pilot was injured, and the Wrights bore the expense of repairs, the crash ended flights until 1910. Both Lahm and Humphreys returned to duty with their respective branches.

Foulois and Beck
The dirigible service proved short-lived, as the corrosive effects of weather and the hydrogen gas used to lift the ship caused the gasbag to leak with increasing severity. The dirigible was condemned and sold at auction. Foulois had been a vocal critic of the dirigible, recommending that it be abandoned, and although one of the two candidates selected to be trained as an airplane pilot, he was sent to Nancy, France instead as a delegate to the International Congress of Aeronautics. Foulois arrived back from France on October 23 and was given some preliminary flight time with Wilbur Wright, even though Wright was not contractually obligated to do so, with the intent that Humphreys would complete Foulois' training.

In November 1909, Foulois became the only officer detailed to the Aeronautical Division. He accrued three hours and two minutes total flying time at College Park but did not solo. Because of inclement winter weather at College Park, Foulois was assigned to move the flying program to Fort Sam Houston, an Army post near San Antonio, Texas. Foulois and eight enlisted men disassembled the still-damaged S.C. No. 1, shipped it to Texas in 17 crates, and reassembled it on February 23, 1910, after building a shed to house it on the Arthur MacArthur Field used for cavalry drill. On 2 March 1910, after training himself, Foulois logged his first solo from 9:30am to 9:37am and four flights in total, crashing the S.C. No. 1 on its final landing. He flew the repaired craft five times on March 12, and received written instruction by mail from the Wright Brothers. Until 1911, Foulois remained as the Army's sole aviator and innovator. He stated in annotating the aircraft's flight log that he installed a  leather cinch strap from the Cavalry saddlery as a safety belt on the S.C. No. 1 on March 12, 1910, then on August 8 he and Oliver Simmons bolted wheels from a cultivator onto the landing skids to provide the first landing gear. S.C. No. 1 made its last flight, and the 66th on it by Foulois, on February 8, 1911.

In early 1911, the United States gathered much of the Regular Army in south Texas as a show of force to Mexican revolutionaries, forming the "Maneuver Division". In March 1911 near Fort McIntosh at Laredo, Texas, Foulois and Wright instructor Philip Orin Parmelee demonstrated the use of airplanes in support of ground maneuvers for the first time. The S.C. No. 1 was not sufficiently airworthy for the reconnaissance and messaging missions it performed, and for a nominal fee of one dollar, Foulois rented the Wright B Flyer privately owned by Robert J. Collier, owner of Collier's Weekly, on February 21. Foulois and Parmalee landed the rented airplane in the Rio Grande during their second flight, on March 5.

Squier, now Chief Signal Officer of the Maneuver Division, formed a provisional aero company on April 5, 1911, the first aviation unit in American history, in anticipation of training 18 additional pilots. Five new airplanes were authorized for purchase, and two were received at Fort Sam on April 20, a Curtiss 1911 "Type IV military aeroplane" (Curtiss Model D) designated Signal Corps No. 2, and a new Wright Model B that became S.C. No. 3. Both came equipped with wheels rather than skids, and the Curtiss aircraft was powered by an 8-cylinder,  engine in sharp contrast to the  4-cylinder training engines the student pilots were accustomed to. Two civilian pilots, Frank Trenholm Coffyn of the Wright Company and Eugene Ely from Curtiss, arrived with the aircraft to assist in instruction. All three of the Army's aircraft took to the air at the same time on April 22, 1911, during a parade and review of troops of the Maneuver Division at Fort Sam Houston, captured in a panoramic photograph linked below.

After Army acceptance of the aircraft on April 27, Foulois and Ely then undertook training a small group pilot candidates on the Curtiss machine, including three (Capt. Paul W. Beck, 2nd Lt. George E.M. Kelly, and 2nd Lt. John C. Walker, Jr.) who had been partially trained as prospective Curtiss instructors by Glen Curtiss at North Island, San Diego, California, before being ordered to Texas. Student pilots were divided into separate sections because the flight controls on the two types were markedly different and the single-seat Curtiss machines did not allow for dual instruction. S.C. No. 1, judged no longer airworthy due to many rebuilds, was retired from service on May 4 and sent to the Smithsonian Institution in October.

The most proficient new pilot was Beck, who by seniority was made commander of the provisional aero company, causing a permanent rift between himself and Foulois, by far the more experienced pilot. The Curtiss machine, S.C. No.2, nearly crashed on May 2 with Walker at the controls, nose-diving when Walker attempted a turn. The plane cartwheeled and although Walker miraculously regained control, he was so badly shaken that he voluntarily withdrew from flying. On May 10, Kelly, the least experienced pilot, was killed flying the same airplane on his qualification flight when he crashed while landing in gusty wind conditions. The division commander, Major General William H. Carter, immediately withdrew permission to fly at Fort Sam. Foulois, who was a mustang officer and a combat veteran of the Spanish–American War, blamed the crash on improper repairs to the Curtiss D, and indirectly, on Beck. Foulois also refused to serve under Beck, who took over as instructor and moved the school back to College Park with S.C. No. 3 in June. Foulois remained behind with the Maneuver Division and was removed from aviation in July by assignment to the Militia Bureau in Washington, D.C. Beck served as the Curtiss instructor at College Park until May 1, 1912, when he was returned to the Infantry by enforcement of the so-called "Manchu Law".

Arnold and Milling

While stationed in the Philippines in 1908, 2nd Lieutenant Henry H. Arnold assisted Capt. Arthur S. Cowan (then in the Infantry) in a military mapping detail. Cowan returned to the United States, transferred to the Signal Corps, and was assigned to recruit two lieutenants to become pilots. Cowan contacted Arnold, who cabled his interest in also transferring to the Signal Corps but heard nothing in reply for two years. In 1911, relocated to Fort Jay, New York, Arnold sent a request to transfer to the Signal Corps, and on April 21, 1911, received orders detailing him and 2nd Lt. Thomas D. Milling to Dayton, Ohio, for flight instruction at the Wright brothers' aviation school. Beginning instruction on May 3, Milling had soloed on May 8 after two hours of flight time while Arnold made his first solo flight May 13 after three hours and forty-eight minutes of flying lessons.

In June, he and Milling completed their instruction and were sent to College Park, Maryland, as the Army's first flight instructors, on June 14. Two Wright B airplanes were available for use in instruction when S.C. No. 4 was delivered five days later and joined S.C. No. 3, newly arrived from Texas. The school officially opened on July 3, 1911, and taught ten students, including two members of the National Guard and Chandler, who had been assigned to command the school and division again after graduation from the Signal School. S.C. No. 2, repaired and returned to service, was joined at the end of July by S.C. No. 6, a new Curtiss E "scout", and Milling became the only aviator able to master the significantly different flight controls of each type. A split developed between the "Wright pilots" and the "Curtiss pilots" that was not resolved until the Wright machines were phased out in 1914 for safety reasons.

Milling won the Tri-State Biplane Race in a Wright B against a field of experienced fliers, flying a course from Boston, Massachusetts, to Nashua, New Hampshire, to Worcester, Massachusetts, to Providence, Rhode Island and back to Boston, a total of 175 miles, without the use of a compass. It was also his first night flight, with several large bonfires providing guidance to the landing field.

In August, he experienced his first crash, trying to take off from a farm field after getting lost. At the end of the November the school disassembled its four aircraft and moved to Augusta, Georgia, for the winter, flying from a leased farm. One of its students, Lt. Col. Charles B. Winder of Ohio, was the first National Guard officer to complete flying training and receive an F.A.I. certificate in the spring of 1912.

Arnold accepted delivery of the Army's first tractor plane (with a propeller and engine mounted on the front) on June 26, 1912, but crashed into the bay at Plymouth, Massachusetts, during takeoff. Arnold began to develop a phobia about flying, intensified by the fatal crashes of the Wright Company instructor who taught him, Arthur L. Welsh on June 12, and an academy classmate of Arnold's, 2d Lt. Lewis Rockwell, on September 18, 1912, both in the new Wright C "speed scouts".

In October 1912, Arnold and Milling were sent to Fort Riley, Kansas, to experiment with spotting for the field artillery. On November 5, Arnold's Wright C stalled, went into a spin, and he narrowly avoided a fatal crash. He immediately and voluntarily grounded himself, then returned to the Infantry in 1913 after closing down the school at College Park, which was discontinued in favor of one with favorable flying conditions year-round on North Island at San Diego, California, later named Rockwell Field in 1917 in memory of Arnold's classmate.

Appropriations, growth, and "incipient mutiny"

In 1911, the Aeronautical Division received its first direct appropriation from Congress for aviation ($125,000 for Fiscal Year 1912, half of what was proposed), and added five airplanes to its inventory.  In addition to S.C.s 2, 3, 4, and 6, a Wright B was ordered to be built under license by Burgess Company and Curtis as its "Model F" (S.C. No. 5). A sixth aircraft, a Wright B Flyer designated S.C. No. 7, was assembled at Fort McKinley in the Philippines and used by Lahm to make the first flight of an American military airplane outside the continental United States on March 21, 1912.

Rules of the Fédération Aéronautique Internationale (FAI) were adopted, including standards for the certification of pilots, and Arnold and Milling became the first two Army pilots to be FAI certified. On February 23, 1912, the U.S. Army established its own military aviator rating and issued the first five (of 24) to Arnold, Chandler, Milling, Beck, and Foulois in July 1912.

In February 1912, recognizing a need for specialized aircraft in field service, the Aeronautical Division drew up its first new specifications for aircraft since 1907, creating a "Scout" classification for a two-man, slow speed, tactical reconnaissance airplane; and "Speed Scout", for a lighter, faster, one-man airplane for strategic (longer ranged) reconnaissance. In May 1912, the division purchased its first Speed Scout, a Wright C. The aircraft crashed during its acceptance trials on June 11 at College Park, killing 2nd Lt. Leighton W. Hazelhurst, who had been among the first class of student pilots, and Arthur L. Welsh, the Wright Company instructor who had taught Arnold to fly. Arnold himself was flying a Wright C (S.C. No. 10) in November 1912 at Fort Riley, Kansas, when he was nearly killed. In total the division purchased six Wright Cs (not including the one flown by Welsh and Hazelhurst) and a Burgess Model J (a Wright C made under license), six of which crashed. This led to the grounding on February 24, 1914, of all "pusher" aircraft, including the sole Wright C survivor and a Burgess model rebuilt to Wright C standard.

In anticipation of a possible war with Mexico, Chandler, four pilots, 21 enlisted men and a detachment of Curtiss JN-3 airplanes were sent from the Aviation School's winter location at Augusta, Georgia, to Texas City, Texas, on February 28, 1913. Ultimately, eight pilots and nine airplanes trained with the 2nd Division on the Gulf Coast and San Antonio. Organized as a provisional unit on March 5, the 1st Aero Squadron became the first permanent unit of the air force on December 8, 1913.

While at Texas City, the junior pilots complained directly about safety concerns to new Chief Signal Officer Brig. Gen. George P. Scriven, who had come to Texas on an inspection trip after reading adverse newspaper reports on the squadron, in effect delivering an ultimatum to Scriven that either Chandler be replaced or they would withdraw from aviation. Despite calling the incident an "incipient mutiny", Scriven relieved Chandler on April 1 and transferred him to Fort McKinley in the Philippines, replaced on an interim basis by Cowan, who was already in Texas City as the signal officer of the mobilizing 2d Division. In September, Lt. Col. Samuel Reber—a former balloonist and influential member of the Aero Club of America—became the new head of the Aeronautical Division. Both Cowan and Reber were non-aviators, causing further friction with the pilots and creating a permanent consensus among them that only an aviator was qualified to command flying units. When the 1st Aero Squadron joined the Curtiss airplanes at North Island in June, Reber made Cowan commandant of the Aviation School at North Island, deepening the divisions.

The United States landed Marines and armed Bluejackets in the Mexican city of Veracruz on April 21, 1914. By April 24 they had completely occupied the city after severe fighting and were provided reconnaissance support by five Navy seaplanes assigned to the United States Atlantic Fleet. Two days later, to reinforce the Navy's aviation detachment, Foulois and four pilots of the 1st Aero Squadron, soon designated the squadron's 1st Company, crated their three Burgess H tractors and shipped them by rail to Fort Crockett at Galveston, leaving only two aircraft and five pilots in San Diego. 1st Company was itself reinforced by six new pilots but never uncrated their airplanes and left Texas on July 13, 1914.

Expansion of the aviation service
Beck was possibly the first advocate of an air service separate from the Army ground forces. In 1912 Beck authored an article for the Infantry Journal entitled, "Military Aviation in America: Its Needs," promoting the concept of an independent air force with its own missions. After he returned to the Infantry, he continued to lobby friends in Congress to return to aviation. In February 1913, Representative James Hay (Democrat-Virginia) introduced a bill intended to transfer aviation from the Signal Corps to the line of the Army as a semi-autonomous "Air Corps".  The bill was considered too radical and died in committee, but when the 1913 appropriations bill included many of its provisions, Hay offered a revised bill in May, HR5304 "An Act to Increase the Efficiency in the Aviation Service".  Hearings were held on the new bill in August 1913. Beck appeared to testify on behalf of the bill, the only officer to do so, and was opposed by Major Billy Mitchell, representing the General Staff, and Foulois, Arnold, and Milling representing the Signal Corps. That bill had its original language expunged and was written to become the enabling legislation for the Aviation Section, Signal Corps on 18 July 1914.

Appropriations for aviation fell to $100,000, in part because the Signal Corps had spent only $40,000 of the Fiscal Year 1912 funding. However, as a result of the high number of fatalities, flight pay (35% increase above base pay) and accelerated promotion for pilots were approved by Congress on March 3, 1913, in the appropriations legislation and the Aeronautical Division grew from 14 to 18 pilots. The Army Air Forces Statistical Digest (World War II) listed the strength of the division at 51 officers and men on November 1, 1912, and 114 on September 30, 1913. Statistics compiled for the HR5304 hearings showed that United States ranked 14th in expenditures among the nations with air services.

In the following year, Congress increased the size and prestige of Signal Corps aviation when it established the Aviation Section, with the Aeronautical Division continued as its headquarters component issuing orders in the name of the Chief Signal Officer. Reber became chief of the section and was promoted to lieutenant colonel, delegating the duties of head of the Aeronautical Division to another non-aviator, Major Edgar Russel, senior instructor and assistant commandant of the Signal School. In February 1917 the Aeronautical Division was one of three divisions in the Office of the Chief Signal Officer (OCSO) comprising the Aviation Section, the others being the Administrative Division and Engineering Division. On October 1, 1917, during World War I, the Aeronautical Division was renamed the Air Division and was abolished altogether by the War Department on April 24, 1918.

Between August 1, 1908, and June 30, 1914, the Signal Corps spent $430,000 on aeronautics,  funding the purchase of 30 aircraft and the building of a 31st (S.C. No. 23) from spare parts. By 1914, only nine of the surviving 23 remained in service, and two of those that were retired never flew operationally.

Aircraft of the Aeronautical Division
SOURCES: Hennessy, The United States Army Air Arm, April 1861 to April 1917, Chapters 2–6, pp. 28–102; Warnock, "From Infant Technology to Obsolescence: the Wright Brothers' Airplane in the U.S. Army Signal Corps, 1905–1915"

Heads of the Aeronautical Division
The executive head of the Aeronautical Division had no official title between 1907 and 1914 but was usually referred to as the officer in charge (OIC). The history of assignments of heads of the division in official orders is murky and confused between 1908 and 1916. The four recognized by the USAF as the OICs of the division during this period, and thus as "head" of its progenitor arm, are denoted by a bullet point. All others are on lists in official studies published by the Office of Air Force History or its successor AFHRA. After July 18, 1914, the division was a part of an aviation section authorized by statute, with a Chief of Division who as head of the headquarters component also exercised control of the section.

August 1, 1907, to July 18, 1914:
Captain Charles deForest Chandler (August 1, 1907 – May 13, 1908)
1st Lt. Frank P. Lahm (May 14, 1908 – December 1909)*
Unknown (December 1909 – June 30, 1910)
Capt. Arthur S. Cowan (July 1, 1910 – June 19, 1911)
Capt. Charles deForest Chandler (June 20, 1911 – April 1, 1913)**
2nd Lt. Henry H. Arnold (September 18, 1912 – December 14, 1912)
Maj. Edgar Russel (December 15, 1912 – September 9, 1913)
Lt. Col. Samuel Reber (September 10, 1913 – July 17, 1914; Chief of Division July 18, 1914 – May 5, 1916)

Acting Chief of Division
Capt. George S. Gibbs (March 17, 1916 – April 2, 1916)
Major Billy Mitchell (April 3, 1916– May 20, 1916)

Chiefs of Division (and Aviation Section head), 1916–1918
Lt. Col. George O. Squier (May 20, 1916 – February 18, 1917)
Lt. Col. John B. Bennet (February 19, 1917 – July 29, 1917)
Maj. Benjamin D. Foulois (July 30, 1917 – November 5, 1917)
Brig. Gen. Alexander L. Dade (November 5, 1917 – February 14, 1918)
Col. Laurence Brown (February 28, 1918 – April 24, 1918)

*The Air Force does not acknowledge Lahm as OIC of the Aeronautical Division between 1908 and 1910. However, Chandler's biography and Hennessy's history (page 14) indicate that from May 1908 to July 1910 Chandler was commander of the Signal Corps Balloon Station at Fort Omaha, Nebraska. Also, Lahm was mandatorily returned to the Cavalry in late 1909, and no replacement is given, although if one was assigned, it was likely Foulois.

**Chandler was also Chief of the Aviation School and commander of the 1st Provisional Aero Squadron when those organizations were active. He was relieved of duty on April 1, 1913, and transferred to the Philippines. Capt. Cowan replaced him in command of the 1st Aero Squadron and as acting OIC of the Aeronautical Division.

Military aviation pioneers with the Aeronautical Division
1st Lt. Henry H. Arnold, 29th Infantry – second rated Military Aviator (July 5, 1912)
Capt. Paul W. Beck, Signal Corps – first nominal head of an operational aviation unit in 1911–12, first advocate of a separate air service
2d Lt. Lewis H. Brereton, Coast Artillery Corps – only member to retire (1948) as part of USAF
Cpl. Vernon L. Burge, Signal Corps – first FAI certified enlisted pilot (June 14, 1912)
Capt. Charles deF. Chandler, Signal Corps – balloonist, twice head of the Aeronautical Division, and third rated pilot (July 5, 1912)
1st Lt. Benjamin D. Foulois, Signal Corps – third solo pilot, first Army instructor pilot
2d Lt Leighton W. Hazelhurst, 17th Infantry – second student pilot fatality (June 11, 1912)
2d Lt. Frederick E. Humphreys, Corps of Engineers – first to solo in a military aircraft (October 26, 1909)
2d Lt. George E. M. Kelly, 30th infantry – first student and pilot fatality (May 10, 1911)
1st Lt. Frank P. Lahm, 6th Cavalry – second solo pilot, first licensed military pilot, and first Army aviator overseas
2d Lt. Moss L. Love, Signal Corps – first pilot trained overseas (killed September 4, 1913)
Sgt.Herbert L. Marcus, US Signal Corps, circa. 1911-1914
1st Lt. Thomas DeW. Milling, 15th Cavalry – first rated Military Aviator (July 5, 1912)
2d Lt. C. Perry Rich, Philippine Scouts – first overseas fatality (November 14, 1913)
2d Lt. Lewis C. Rockwell, 10th Infantry – first licensed pilot fatality (September 18, 1912)
Corp. Frank S. Scott, Signal Corps – first enlisted and second passenger fatality (September 18, 1912)
1st Lt. Thomas E. Selfridge, Jr., 1st Field Artillery – first Army officer to learn to fly, first airplane fatality (September 17, 1908)

See also
Aviation Section, U.S. Signal Corps

Lineage of the United States Air Force
 Aeronautical Division, Signal Corps August 1, 1907 – July 18, 1914
 Aviation Section, Signal Corps July 18, 1914 – May 20, 1918
 Division of Military Aeronautics May 20, 1918 – May 24, 1918
 Air Service, United States Army May 24, 1918 – July 2, 1926
 United States Army Air Corps July 2, 1926 – June 20, 1941
 United States Army Air Forces June 20, 1941 – September 18, 1947
 United States Air Force September 18, 1947 – present

Notes

Footnotes

Citations

References

Bowman, Martin W., "Background to War", USAAF Handbook 1939–1945, 

Correll, John T. "The First of the Force," AIR FORCE Magazine, August 2007, Vol. 90, No. 8, Air Force Association, Arlington, Virginia
Cragg, Dan, ed., Sgt.Maj. USA (Ret.) (1983). The guide to Military Installations, Stackpole Books, Harrisburg
 AFD-100928-011 (Air Force Historical Studies Office document)
Greely, Gen. Adolphus W. (1900). "Balloons in War", Harper's Monthly Magazine, CI (DCI), pp. 33–50.

 
 
Lienhard, John H., Inventing the Air Force, "The Engines of Our Ingenuity" Episode 1974.

Maurer, Maurer (1983). Air Force Combat Units of World War II, Office of Air Force History,  "Introduction"

 

 

"2005 Almanac," Air Force Magazine, May 2005, Vol. 88, No. 5, the Air Force Association, Arlington, Virginia
Paul W. Beck, The Early Birds of Aviation

External links
Provisional Aero Company in flight, Fort Sam Houston, Texas Parade of the Maneuver Division on April 22, 1911, with S.C. No. 2 (Curtiss D) at right, S.C. No. 3 (Wright B) at center, and S.C. No. 1 (Wright A) at left

Aeronautical Division, Army Signal Corps
Signal units and formations of the United States Army
Aeronautical Division, Army Signal Corps
Aeronautical Division, Army Signal Corps
20th-century history of the United States Air Force
Aeronautical Division, Army Signal Corps
Military units and formations established in 1907
Military units and formations disestablished in 1914
1907 establishments in the United States
1914 disestablishments in the United States
Disbanded air forces